Juan de Dios Prados López (born 12 August 1986), known as Juande, is a Spanish professional footballer who plays as a defensive midfielder for Australian club Adelaide United FC.

Formed at Betis, he totalled 80 games and three goals for the team including three seasons in La Liga, and made 156 appearances in the Segunda División for them and three other teams. He also played in Belgium, Italy, Australia and India.

Club career

Betis
Born in Alicante, Valencian Community, and brought up in Real Betis' youth system, Juande was raised in Motril, Province of Granada since he was a child, and he made his debut for the first team on 6 December 2005 in a UEFA Champions League game against R.S.C. Anderlecht, being replaced by Marcos Assunção in the 71st minute of a 0–1 home loss as the race for the UEFA Cup position was already decided in favour of the former.

Juande would only play in La Liga in the following season, his debut coming on 17 February 2007 as he started and was booked in a 0–0 draw at Real Madrid; at this time he was still registered for the reserves. He would appear in 22 matches in the 2007–08 campaign, scoring his first goal on 19 April 2008 in a 3–1 win over Atlético Madrid at the Vicente Calderón Stadium.

On 5 November 2007, it was speculated that English Premier League team Liverpool would make a €8 million purchase of Juande, replacing Mohamed Sissoko, but the deal never materialised. He played only nine games in 2008–09 as Betis were relegated to Segunda División after eight years, adding 19 (with two goals) the following season, with the Andalusians failing to regain their lost status.

In the last days of the 2011 January transfer window, Juande was loaned to Betis neighbours Granada CF, joining his local club until the end of the second division campaign. He totalled 29 appearances for the two teams, with both finally attaining promotion.

Later career
In August 2011, Juande released himself from his Betis contract and moved to K.V.C. Westerlo of the Belgian Pro League on a two-year deal. Twelve months later, he was back in his country's second tier at SD Ponferradina. After two seasons as an undisputed first choice for the team from El Bierzo, he joined Spezia Calcio in the Italian Serie B on 16 July 2014. Two years later he returned to his homeland, on loan to UCAM Murcia CF.

At the age of 32, Juande moved to the Australian A-League in July 2018, agreeing to a two-year contract at Perth Glory FC. He helped the club come first in his debut season, scoring a late penalty winner on 13 January in a 4–3 home victory over Western Sydney Wanderers FC. In September 2020, he left.

Juande joined Indian Super League side Kerala Blasters FC on 28 December 2020 for the remainder of the season, as a replacement for the seriously injured Sergio Cidoncha He made his debut the following 15 January, coming on as a substitute for captain Jessel Carneiro in a 1–1 draw against SC East Bengal.

Juande returned to the Australian top division on 24 March 2021, signing a short-term deal with Adelaide United FC. His contract was renewed twice, both alongside compatriot Javi López. On 29 January Juande was seriously injured during the match against Melbourne City when he and City's Florin Berenguer challenged for the ball in the 66th minute. His right leg was broken and left at an unnatural angle. Describing about the seriousness of the injury, Adelaide's head coach Carl Veart, said: “It's something that you don't want to ever witness on a football field". "I was literally metres away from where it happened and I could hear the crack, it was an awful sound,” sideline commentator Michael Zappone said. The match was paused for nearly half an hour following the injury.

International career
Juande won his only cap for the Spanish under-21s on 16 November 2007, coming in midway through the second half of the 3–0 home win against Poland for the 2009 UEFA European Championship qualifiers.

Career statistics

Honours
Betis
Segunda División: 2010–11

Perth Glory
A-League: Premiers 2018–19

References

External links

1986 births
Living people
People from Motril
Sportspeople from the Province of Granada
Spanish footballers
Footballers from Alicante
Footballers from Andalusia
Association football midfielders
La Liga players
Segunda División players
Tercera División players
Betis Deportivo Balompié footballers
Real Betis players
Granada CF footballers
SD Ponferradina players
UCAM Murcia CF players
Belgian Pro League players
K.V.C. Westerlo players
Serie B players
Spezia Calcio players
A-League Men players
Perth Glory FC players
Adelaide United FC players
Indian Super League players
Kerala Blasters FC players
Spain under-21 international footballers
Spanish expatriate footballers
Expatriate footballers in Belgium
Expatriate footballers in Italy
Expatriate soccer players in Australia
Expatriate footballers in India
Spanish expatriate sportspeople in Belgium
Spanish expatriate sportspeople in Italy
Spanish expatriate sportspeople in Australia
Spanish expatriate sportspeople in India